Papageorgiou is a Greek surname. It may refer to one of the following people:

Alexandra Papageorgiou (born 1980), Greek female athlete
Christos Papageorgiou (disambiguation), several people
Michail Papageorgiou (1727-1796), Greek philosopher
George Papageorgiou (born c.1958), Greek-American football player and coach in the United States
Kostas Papageorgiou (born 1945), Greek poet and critic

Greek-language surnames
Surnames
Patronymic surnames